Leyson Séptimo Rojas (born July 7, 1985) is a Dominican former professional baseball pitcher. He previously played for the Chicago White Sox and the Chunichi Dragons of Nippon Professional Baseball (NPB).

Career

Arizona Diamondbacks
Séptimo appeared in the 2009 All-Star Futures Game. He was a Southern League mid-season All-Star in 2010.

Chicago White Sox
On June 13, 2011, Séptimo was claimed off waivers by the Chicago White Sox from the Arizona Diamondbacks and optioned to the Double-A Birmingham Barons.

Séptimo was promoted to the major leagues for the first time on June 28, 2012. On June 29, 2012, Séptimo made his Major League debut against the New York Yankees pitching a perfect 9th inning while striking out Alex Rodriguez and Robinson Canó.

Atlanta Braves
On January 10, 2015, Septimo signed a minor league deal with the Atlanta Braves.

Joplin Blasters
On April 5, 2016, Septimo was released by the Joplin Blasters.

Chunichi Dragons
On June 5, 2016, Septimo was signed by the NPB team Chunichi Dragons. On 29 October, it was confirmed that Septimo would be released from the Dragons along with Ricardo Nanita, Juan Jaime, Drew Naylor and Anderson Hernandez.

Pitching Style
Séptimo throws four pitches — a four-seam fastball in the low 90s, a two-seam fastball, a slider averaging at about 80 mph, and an occasional changeup. The slider is his main 2-strike pitch.

References

External links

1985 births
Living people
Águilas Cibaeñas players
Amarillo Thunderheads players
Birmingham Barons players
Central American and Caribbean Games bronze medalists for the Dominican Republic
Charlotte Knights players
Chicago White Sox players
Chunichi Dragons players
Competitors at the 2014 Central American and Caribbean Games
Dominican Republic expatriate baseball players in Japan
Dominican Republic expatriate baseball players in the United States

Major League Baseball pitchers
Major League Baseball players from the Dominican Republic
Mobile BayBears players
Nippon Professional Baseball pitchers
Reno Aces players
South Bend Silver Hawks players
Southern Maryland Blue Crabs players
Visalia Oaks players
Visalia Rawhide players
Yakima Bears players
York Revolution players
Central American and Caribbean Games medalists in baseball
Dominican Republic expatriate baseball players in Puerto Rico
Cangrejeros de Santurce (baseball) players